Armand Lanoux (24 October 1913 - 23 March 1983) was a French writer.

Biography 
Lanoux was born in Paris. Early in life he had several jobs: he was a teacher, designer of candy boxes, bank employee, painter and journalist.

He became an editor for the literary Artheme Fayard (1950), editor of the magazine À la page (1964), chaired the Committee on French television in 1958-1959, and was appointed Secretary General of Radio and Television International University. He was a member of the France-USSR Association. He participated in drafting the Code des Usages.

He wrote in many genres: the novel, non-fiction, chronicles, drama, poetry (Apollinaire 1953 Chapman prize).

From 1957 to 1964, he spent several months a year in Saint-Jean-Cap-Ferrat. In 1963, he earned accolades in winning the Prix Goncourt for his novel "When the tide goes out."

In 1970, he co-wrote with Marcel Cravenne Lys dans la vallée, directed by Marcel Cravenne, based on the novel by Honoré de Balzac. In 1980, he adapted the novel by Balzac La Peau de chagrin for television, directed by Michel Favart.

He died in Champs-sur-Marne, aged 69.

Awards
 Prix du roman populiste, for La Nef des fous
 Grand Prix du roman of Société des Gens de Lettres, Les Lézards dans l'horloge
 Prix Interallié, Le Commandant Watrin
 Prix Goncourt, Quand la mer se retire

Works
 La Canadienne assassinée (Colbert) 1943 :
 Le Pont de la folie (Colbert) 1946
 L'Affaire de l'impasse Ronsin 1947
 La Nef des fous (Amiot-Dumont/Julliard) 1948,
 L'Enfant en proie aux images (Labeyrie) 1949
 La Classe du matin (Fayard) 1949
 Cet âge trop tendre (Éditions Julliard) 1951
 Colporteur (Seghers), 1953 Prix Apollinaire
 Les Lézards dans l'horloge (Julliard), 1953
 Bonjour, Monsieur Zola (Amiot-Dumont/Hachette) 1954
 Le Photographe délirant (Seghers) 1956
 Le Commandant Watrin (Julliard), 1956
 Yododo (Fayard) 1957
 Le Rendez-vous de Bruges (Julliard) 1958
 Un jeune homme en habit 1958
 La Tulipe orageuse (Seghers) 1959
 La Tête tranchée : à quoi jouent les enfants du bourreau (Julliard) 1959
 1900, la bourgeoisie absolue (Hachette) 1961
 Quand la mer se retire (Julliard), 1963
 Le Berger des abeilles (Grasset) 1974
 La Corsetière prodigieuse'' (Jean-Pierre Kupczyk éditor) 1988

Writers from Paris
1913 births
1983 deaths
20th-century French novelists
French crime fiction writers
Prix Goncourt winners
Prix Interallié winners
Prix Guillaume Apollinaire winners
20th-century French male writers